The women's 100 metres event at the 2005 Summer Universiade was held on 15–16 August in Izmir, Turkey.

Medalists

Results

Heats
Wind:Heat 1: -1.5 m/s,  Heat 2: -0.5 m/s,  Heat 3: +1.7 m/s,  Heat 4: +0.4 m/s,  Heat 5: +1.1 m/s,  Heat 6: -0.3 m/s,  Heat 7: +0.1 m/s,  Heat 8: +0.8 m/s

Quarterfinals
Wind:Heat 1: -1.2 m/s,  Heat 2: +0.4 m/s,  Heat 3: -0.6 m/s,  Heat 4: -0.2 m/s

Semifinals
Wind:Heat 1: +0.6 m/s,  Heat 2: +0.5 m/s

Final
Wind: +1.1 m/s

References

Finals results
Full results

Athletics at the 2005 Summer Universiade
2005 in women's athletics
2005